Cerro Azul Municipality is one of the 212 municipalities of the Mexican state of Veracruz. It is located in the state's Huasteca Baja region. The municipal seat is the city of Cerro Azul, Veracruz.

In the 2005 INEGI Census, the municipality reported a total population of 24,739 (down from 27,071 in 1995), of whom 
23,573 lived in the municipal seat. 
Of the municipality's inhabitants, 565 (2%) spoke an indigenous language, primarily Huasteco and Nahuatl.

Cerro Azul Municipality covers a total surface area of 92.50 km2.

References

External links 
  Municipal Official Site
  Municipal Official Information

Municipalities of Veracruz